Raymond Plaza (born 3 April 1932) is a French racing cyclist. He rode in the 1957 Tour de France.

References

1932 births
Living people
French male cyclists
Place of birth missing (living people)